Gerard "Gerry" Droller (1905? - 1992) was a German CIA officer involved in the covert 1954 Guatemalan coup d'état and the recruitment of Cuban exiles in the preparation of the  Bay of Pigs Invasion in April 1961.

Biography
Gerard Droller was born in Germany. He worked with Office of Strategic Services (OSS) and the Maquis in France during World War II. 

On 21 April 1959, Droller had a three-hour meeting with Fidel Castro in a hotel room in New York City after the latter's visit to Washington. 

In June 1960, Droller was sent to Miami, as Chief Political Action (C/WH/4/PA) under Jacob Esterline to help organize the overthrow of Fidel Castro in Cuba. Adopting the name Frank Bender, he posed as a wealthy steel tycoon. His main task was to recruit and organize the political leaders of anti-Castro Cuban exiles in the Miami area, assisted by E. Howard Hunt alias "Eduardo". He recruited Manuel Artime who became the leader of Movimiento de Recuperación Revolucionaria (Revolutionary Recovery Movement), (MRR), and later Brigade 2506. During 1960 and 1961, Droller organized the setting up of training camps for Cuban exiles at Useppa Island, Florida, and at Retalhuleu, Guatemala by arrangement with Guatemalan president Miguel Ydigoras. He helped recruit Cuban exiles into a paramilitary force subsequently named Brigade 2506 that, with considerable finance from the CIA, carried out the abortive invasion of Cuba at the Bay of Pigs on 17 April 1961. He did not speak Spanish, and he was not universally liked by the Cuban exiles.

See also
CIA activities in Guatemala
Cuban Project

Notes

References
Anderson, Jon L. 1997. Che Guevara: A Revolutionary Life.  
Kornbluh, Peter. 1998. Bay of Pigs Declassified: The Secret CIA Report on the Invasion of Cuba. The New Press. New York.  
Rodriguez, Juan Carlos. 1999. Bay of Pigs and the CIA. Ocean Press Melbourne.  
Szulc, Tad. 1986. Fidel - A Critical Portrait. Hutchinson. 
Thomas, Hugh. 1971, 1986. The Cuban Revolution. Weidenfeld and Nicolson. London. (Shortened version of Cuba: The Pursuit of Freedom, includes all history 1952-1970)   
Wyden, Peter. 1979. Bay of Pigs - The Untold Story. Simon and Schuster. New York.

External links
The Trujillo Conspiracy http://www.latinamericanstudies.org/cuban-rebels/trujillo-conspiracy.htm

1900s births
1992 deaths
Year of birth uncertain
American Cold War spymasters
American spies
Cold War spies
Opposition to Fidel Castro
People of the Central Intelligence Agency
People of the Office of Strategic Services
German spies
German emigrants to the United States